Tertrema is an extinct genus of trematosaurian temnospondyl within the family Trematosauridae. It has an elongate snout and widely spaced occipital condyles.

See also
 Prehistoric amphibian
 List of prehistoric amphibians

References

Trematosaurines
Fossil taxa described in 1915